Red Rock Ecological Reserve is an ecological reserve located adjacent to the Tom Lamb Wildlife Management Area, Manitoba, Canada. It was established in 1979 under the Manitoba Crown Lands Act.

See also
 List of ecological reserves in Manitoba
 List of protected areas of Manitoba

References

External links
 iNaturalist: Red Rock Ecological Reserve

Protected areas established in 1979
Ecological reserves of Manitoba
Nature reserves in Manitoba
Protected areas of Manitoba